Margaret Macchiut (born 14 July 1974) is a retired Italian athlete who specialised in the 100 metres hurdles. She won the bronze medal at the 2001 Mediterranean Games.

Biography
Her personal bests are 13.03 seconds in the 100 metres hurdles (+1.6 m/s, Valencia 2006) and 8.14 seconds in the 60 metres hurdles (Ancona 2005).

She is married to a former footballer, Alessandro Teodorani.

Competition record

References

External links
 

1974 births
Living people
People from Nova Gorica
Italian female hurdlers
Mediterranean Games bronze medalists for Italy
Mediterranean Games medalists in athletics
Athletes (track and field) at the 1997 Mediterranean Games
Athletes (track and field) at the 2001 Mediterranean Games
20th-century Italian women
21st-century Italian women